František Schuster was a Czech sports shooter. He competed in the trap event at the 1924 Summer Olympics.

References

External links
 

Year of birth missing
Year of death missing
Czech male sport shooters
Olympic shooters of Czechoslovakia
Shooters at the 1924 Summer Olympics
Place of birth missing